John Thomas Looney (luni) (14 August 1870 – 17 January 1944) was an English school teacher who is notable for having originated the Oxfordian theory, which claims that Edward de Vere, 17th Earl of Oxford (1550–1604) was the true author of Shakespeare's plays.

Looney came from a Methodist religious background, but later converted to the rationalistic Religion of Humanity, becoming a leader of its church in Tyneside. After the failure of the local church, Looney turned to the Shakespeare authorship question, publishing in 1920 his theory that de Vere was the author of most of the poems and plays published in Shakespeare's name. He later argued that de Vere had also written works published under the names of other poets.

Life

Looney was born in South Shields to John Thomas and Annie Looney. His father had a shoe-making shop at 91 West Holborn in the centre of the town. Both his parents were Methodists. His family came from the Isle of Man and claimed descent from the Earls of Derby. He grew up in a strong evangelical environment, and determined to become a minister at the age of 16. While studying at the Chester Diocesan College, he lost his faith. He later embraced the theories of the positivist philosopher Auguste Comte, becoming a proponent of the Comtean "Religion of Humanity" and a leader in the short-lived Church of Humanity, an independent British branch of the religion, in which he pioneered outdoor preaching. The Church of Humanity gave special prominence to Shakespeare, naming a month after him in the Positivist calendar, and placing a bust of him in its place of worship.

Looney worked as a school teacher in Gateshead. He is listed in Ward's Directory for 1899–1900 as a teacher living at 119 Rodsley Avenue, Gateshead. He later resided at 15 Laburnum Gardens, Low Fell.

After the failure of the Comtean church, Looney devoted himself to research into the authorship of Shakespeare's plays. He developed his theory during World War I, depositing his claim to priority in a sealed document at the British Museum in 1918. In 1920 he published his work, whose short title is Shakespeare Identified, through Cecil Palmer in London. Looney, who resisted his publisher's suggestion that he use a pseudonym, argued that the real author of Shakespeare's plays was Edward de Vere, Earl of Oxford, who fitted Looney's deductions that Shakespeare was, among much else, a nobleman of Lancastrian sympathies, with a fondness for Italy and a leaning towards Catholicism. Looney believed his argument followed the systematic methods prescribed by Positivism.

In 1922 he joined with George Greenwood to establish The Shakespeare Fellowship, the organisation which subsequently carried forward public discussion of the authorship question up to the 1940s. Looney acquired a number of followers and supporters, most notably Sigmund Freud, who read Looney's book in 1923. Even at the end of his life, in 1939, Freud repeats his view in the final revision of An Outline of Psychoanalysis.

Two of his followers, Percy Allen and B. M. Ward, developed the Prince Tudor theory, which claimed that Oxford and Queen Elizabeth I were lovers and had a son together. Looney was strongly opposed to the theory, writing that it was "extravagant & improbable" and "likely to bring the whole cause into ridicule."

Looney was a member of the Literary and Philosophical Society of Newcastle upon Tyne after 1911 and paid handsome tribute to the library; its unique system of operation, he said, "ensured an ease and rapidity of work which would be impossible in any other institution in the country". Looney presented the "Lit and Phil" with his edition of Edward de Vere's poems in December 1927.

He died at Swadlincote, near Burton-on-Trent, where he lodged after being forced to abandon his home in Gateshead because of the heavy German bombing of the area. He was survived by his daughters Evelyn and Gladys. Evelyn had a son who was given the middle name of De Vere.

Theory

Looney's book begins by outlining many of the familiar anti-Stratfordian arguments about Shakespeare of Stratford's supposedly poor education and unpoetic personality. He also criticises the methods adopted by many previous anti-Stratfordians, especially the Baconian tendency to search for ciphers. Looney considers it unlikely that an author who wished to conceal his identity would leave such messages. He then goes on to identify the influence of Frank Harris's book The Man Shakespeare, which uses the plays to find evidence of Shakespeare's beliefs and interests. Looney states that it is possible to use this method to identify the type of person who must have written the works. He considered that lower class characters were portrayed as buffoons and that the author had no sympathy for the middle-classes. He was, however, dedicated to old-fashioned feudal ideals of nobility and service. He also believed in a highly structured, dutiful and ordered society.

For Looney the plays expressed a distinct political vision that combined elements of feudalism and modern scepticism towards traditional religion. He also believed that events and characters in the plays must correspond to the life of the author. Studying the biographies of Elizabethan aristocrats, he became convinced that Edward de Vere's career and personal experience could be mapped onto the action of the plays. Since de Vere died in 1604, many years before a number of Shakespeare's works appeared, Looney argued that there is an abrupt change in publication history and in the style of plays apparently written after 1604. Unusually, Looney argued that The Tempest was not the work of Oxford/Shakespeare, but of another author. It had been mistakenly added to the canon. He argued that its style and the "dreary negativism" it promoted were inconsistent with Shakespeare's "essentially positivist" soul, and so could not have been written by Oxford. He also suggested that the evidence of other writers' hands in late plays such as Pericles, Prince of Tyre implied that the author had died, leaving them unfinished. Such works were completed and published by others, as were the sonnets, the dedication page of which implied to Looney that the author was deceased.

Looney expanded his views in later publications, especially his 1921 edition of de Vere's poetry. Looney suggested that de Vere was also responsible for some of the literary works published under the names of Arthur Golding, Anthony Munday and John Lyly.

Reception and assessments
Looney's book started a whole new avenue of speculation and has many followers today. In general, alternative authorship theories are dismissed by all but a few English professors and Shakespeare scholars, who accept the historical attribution to Shakespeare of Stratford.

Early reviewers were less than kind. The reviewer for The Outlook dismissed the book after reading but a few chapters, writing that it appeared "to have all the paraphernalia of scholarship but little of its critical spirit" with "sweeping suppositions" based on little evidence.

In The Times Literary Supplement review, A. W. Pollard praised the author for his honesty in admitting to his ignorance of Early Modern poetry and drama, to which he attributes Looney's methods and conclusions. He calls the book "a sad waste of print and paper" and writes that Looney's arguments for Oxford are much more strained and incredulous than those for Shakespeare, and also points out some glaring lapses of logic. About Looney's declaration that The Tempest was not written by the same author as the rest of the Shakespearean canon, he writes:
Having begun, on the usual "Baconian" lines, by insisting that "there was subterfuge in the manner of publishing the First Folio edition"—which implies, if it implies anything, that the publishers were aware of the true authorship—he ends by maintaining that the play to which they assigned the place of honour was by someone else. To be suspicious about gnats and swallow camels seems the inevitable beginning and end of all these identifications of Shakespeare; but Mr. Looney exemplifies the process with a frankness all his own.

In a review of Looney's Poems of Edward de Vere Seventeenth Earl of Oxford (1921) in the introduction to his edition of The Paradise of Dainty Devices (1927), Hyder Edwards Rollins says that Looney reveals little familiarity with poetical miscellanies or Elizabethan publishing conditions. He writes that "The verbal parallels between Oxford's Paradise poems and Shakespeare's works which Mr. Looney painstakingly amasses are, on the whole, mere commonplaces, often straight-out proverbs, that could be vastly increased in bulk by a person familiar with Elizabethan poetry. They prove nothing except that Shakespeare and Oxford, like all other Elizabethans, indulged in the use of fashionable commonplaces and figures."

According to Steven May, who produced the standard edition of Edward de Vere's poetry, "[t]he motifs and stylistic traits that Looney and his followers have claimed through the years to be unique to the verse of both the Earl of Oxford and Shakespeare are in fact commonplaces of Elizabethan poetry employed by many other contemporary writers. The Oxfordians have failed to establish any meaningful connection between Oxford's verse and Shakespeare's. Stripped of this argument, the Earl is no more likely to have written Shakespeare's works than any other Elizabethan poet."

By contrast, Oxfordians Warren Hope and Kim Holston, in recounting Looney's methodology, say that "[h]aving found someone who met all the conditions he had originally established, Looney devotes a chapter to a comparison of Oxford's verse with the early work of Shakespeare, a tour de force of literary and historical analysis which in some ways anticipates the procedures of the 'new criticism.'"
David Chandler notes that Looney’s psychological method of discovering the true author was more congruent to the traditions of Romantic criticism as exemplified by Edward Dowden's attempt to discover the personality of the author by gleaning clues from the works in his Shakspere (1875).
Oxfordianism, from the start, assumed something similar.… In the cultural situation of the early twentieth century, Looney is quite understandable. He took the case against the Stratford man, put forward by the Baconians and widely accepted, and combined its conclusions with the post-Dowden desire to read the plays as representing an intimate, credible, psycho-drama.
He goes on to say that Oxfordism's principles—late expressions of the prevailing critical fashions of their times—were outdated by changing critical scholarship, and that Oxfordians must find some other way to relate to contemporary scholarship if they expect the theory to be taken seriously outside of Oxfordian circles.
 Oxfordianism's premises were soon challenged by the emergence of "impersonal" and formalist criticisms. … Looney's theoretical assumptions were … becoming obsolete in 1920, and the following half century saw a more and more determined turn away from biographical criticism …. [Oxfordians'] work, indeed, seems to have paid no attention to changes in the academic approach to Shakespeare (and other English literature) since 1920. … By contrast, a reiterated claim of Oxfordian literature has been that the case is already, unarguably, complete. … this is akin to the claims made for religious texts…. Reading Oxfordian scholarship one often encounters a slippery area in which it is unclear whether Oxford's authorship of the plays is being argued for, or simply assumed.
... Looney's conclusions cannot be proved true, and believing them requires some degree of "faith." Put more simply, Looney made an argument, however much some might like to believe that he merely announced a discovery. … That argument needs to be updated, if it is to stimulate serious academic interest … The biographical approach to literature now needs to be theoretically justified before many of the claims for De Vere's authorship of the plays are pressed further. Oxfordians have so far shown an unfortunate reluctance to question how much they work with post-"Romantic" assumptions about authorship. … they need to show that such ideas enjoyed a currency in the late sixteenth century before devoting much attention to the specific case for alleged relationship between De Vere and the Shakespearean corpus. If this is not possible … then at least a much broader case needs to be constructed for the autobiographical nature of dramatic writing at that time.

Publications
 Looney, J. Thomas. "Shakespeare" identified in Edward De Vere, the seventeenth earl of Oxford. London: C. Palmer, New York: Frederick A. Stokes Co. (1920)
 Looney, J. Thomas, ed. The poems of Edward De Vere, seventeenth earl of Oxford. London: C. Palmer (1921)

References

Bibliography
 Jonathan Bate, "The genius of Shakespeare", Oxford University Press US, 1998, p. 68
 William F. and Elizabeth S. Friedman, "The Shakspearean Ciphers Examined", Cambridge University Press, 1957, p. 7
 Russ McDonald, "Shakespeare: an anthology of criticism and theory, 1945–2000", Wiley-Blackwell, 2004, pp. 4–8
 Samuel Schoenbaum, "Shakespeare's lives", Clarendon Press, 1970, pp. 597–598
 Richard F. Whalen, "Shakespeare – who was he?: the Oxford challenge to the Bard of Avon", Greenwood Publishing Group, 1994, pp. 68–69
 Bill Bryson, Shakespeare: The World as Stage, Atlas Books, an imprint of Harper Collins Press, 2007, pp. 188–191

External links 
 Toronto Star review of Contested Will: Who Wrote Shakespeare?
 
 

Alumni of the University of Chester
English writers
Oxfordian theory of Shakespeare authorship
1870 births
1944 deaths
People from South Shields
Shakespeare authorship theorists
Fringe theories